Christian Dollberg (born 3 November 1971) is an Argentine former footballer who played as a defender.

Dollberg started his playing career in 1992 with Argentinos Juniors, he has also played for Lanús, Boca Juniors and Defensores de Belgrano in Argentina.

Dollberg also played in Europe for 1. FC Köln of Germany and PAOK F.C. of Greece.

In 2001, aged less than 30 years, Dollberg retired from football.

References

External links
 Christian Dollberg – Argentine Primera statistics at Fútbol XXI 
 Christian Dollberg at BDFA.com.ar 

Living people
1971 births
Footballers from Buenos Aires
Association football defenders
Argentine footballers
Argentinos Juniors footballers
Club Atlético Lanús footballers
1. FC Köln players
Boca Juniors footballers
PAOK FC players
Defensores de Belgrano footballers
Argentine Primera División players
Bundesliga players
Super League Greece players
Argentine expatriate footballers
Expatriate footballers in Germany
Expatriate footballers in Greece
Argentine people of German descent